The 2017–18 Senior Women's Cricket Inter Zonal Three Day Game was the fourth season of India's Inter Zonal women's first-class competition. The tournament took place from 18 March to 5 April 2018. Five zonal teams participated in the tournament, facing each other in a round-robin format in three-day matches. All matches took place in Thiruvananthapuram. North Zone won the tournament, achieving their first title.

Competition format
The five teams played in a round-robin league, therefore playing four matches. Matches were played using a three-day format.

The league worked on a points system with positions within the divisions being based on the total points. Points were awarded as follows:

Win: 6 points. 
Tie: 3 points. 
Loss: 0 points.
Drawn (lead after first innings): 3 points. 
Drawn (trail after first innings): 1 point. 
Drawn (no decision on first innings): 1 point. 
Abandoned without a ball bowled: 1 point. 

If points in the final table are equal, teams are separated by most wins, then net run rate.

Standings

Source: CricketArchive

Fixtures

Round 1

Round 2

Round 3

Round 4

Round 5

References

2017–18
2017–18 Indian women's cricket
Domestic cricket competitions in 2017–18